The Century Mining Corporation is a Canadian gold producer formed in 2003. The company has produced 9.4 million ounces of gold.

In 2012 the company entered insolvency.

References 

Gold mining companies of Canada